Ilyinskoye-Khovanskoye is an urban-type settlement and the administrative center of Ilyinsky District, Ivanovo Oblast, Russia. Population:

References

Notes

Sources

Urban-type settlements in Ivanovo Oblast
Rostovsky Uyezd (Yaroslavl Governorate)